Lim Cheol (born November 20, 1991), better known by his stage name DinDin, is a South Korean rapper, producer, television personality and radio personality. He made his debut in the entertainment world in 2013 when he appeared as a contestant on “Show me the Money 2”. Since then, he has released numerous non-album singles, contributed to quite a few television drama soundtracks, and continued to make appearances on various reality programs, including “Dunia: Into a New World” (2018) and “Yo~! Welcome to Korea!” (2019) and has been a cast member of the variety show 2 Days & 1 Night Season 4 since 2019.

Philanthropy 
On February 8, 2023, Dindin donated 10 million won to help 2023 Turkey–Syria earthquake, by donating money through Korean Red Cross.

Discography

Studio albums

Extended plays

Singles

Featured singles

Soundtrack appearances

Other appearances

Song produced

Filmography

Television series

Television show

Web show

Radio programs

Awards and nominations

Notes

References

External links 
 

1991 births
Living people
South Korean male rappers
South Korean hip hop singers
Show Me the Money (South Korean TV series) contestants
Templeton Secondary School alumni
Musicians from Seoul
Rappers from Seoul
South Korean television personalities